Valentina Vîrlan is a Romanian rower. In the 1987 World Rowing Championships, she won a gold medal in the women's coxed four event and women's eight event.

References

See also

Romanian female rowers
World Rowing Championships medalists for Romania
Year of birth missing (living people)
Living people